Marta López Herrero (born 4 February 1990) is a Spanish female handball player for SCM Râmnicu Vâlcea and the Spanish national team.

López was voted Best Right Wing of the 2007 European Junior Championships and of the Ligue Feminine de Handball D1 in France in the 2012–13 and 2013–14 seasons.

International honours   
EHF Cup Winners' Cup:
Finalist: 2015
European Championship:
Silver Medalist: 2014
Olympic Games:
Bronze Medalist: 2012

Individual awards
French Championship Best Right Wing: 2013, 2014

References

External links

Living people
1990 births
Handball players at the 2012 Summer Olympics
Handball players at the 2016 Summer Olympics
Olympic handball players of Spain
Spanish female handball players
Sportspeople from Málaga
Expatriate handball players
Spanish expatriate sportspeople in France
Spanish expatriate sportspeople in Romania
Medalists at the 2012 Summer Olympics
Olympic bronze medalists for Spain
Olympic medalists in handball
Competitors at the 2013 Mediterranean Games
SCM Râmnicu Vâlcea (handball) players
Mediterranean Games competitors for Spain
Handball players at the 2020 Summer Olympics
20th-century Spanish women
21st-century Spanish women